Ellis Dean (1 July 1854 – 8 November 1920) was an Australian politician.

He was born in Macquarie Plains, Tasmania. In 1901 he was elected to the Tasmanian Legislative Council as the member for Derwent. He represented the seat until his death in New Norfolk in 1920.

References

1854 births
1920 deaths
Independent members of the Parliament of Tasmania
Members of the Tasmanian Legislative Council